Castello a Mare or Castellammare is an ancient fortress that guarded the entrance to the port at Palermo in La Cala. Extensive remains are visible, some of which are open to the public. There is a Norman keep, a fortified gate or entrance, and remains of a sophisticated Renaissance star-shaped defence.

References 

Castles in Palermo
Archaeological sites in Palermo
Arab-Norman architecture in Palermo